
Gmina Władysławów is a rural gmina (administrative district) in Turek County, Greater Poland Voivodeship, in west-central Poland.

Villages
Gmina Władysławów contains the villages and settlements of Beznazwa, Chylin, Emerytka, Felicjanów, Głogowa, Jabłonna, Józefów, Kamionka, Kuny, Leonia, Małoszyna, Mariantów, Międzylesie, Milinów, Natalia, Olesin, Piorunów, Polichno, Przemysławów, Przyborów, Russocice, Skarbki, Stawki, Stefania, Tarnowski Młyn, Wandów, Władysławów and Wyszyna.

Neighbouring gminas
Gmina Władysławów is bordered by the gminas of Brudzew, Kościelec, Krzymów, Tuliszków and Turek.

References
Polish official population figures 2006

Wladyslawow
Turek County